The Archipelago of the Recherche, known locally as the Bay of Isles, is a group of 105 islands, and over 1200 "obstacles to shipping", off the south coast of Western Australia.
The western group is near Esperance and the eastern group at Israelite Bay. They are located in coastal waters, part of which is designated the Recherche Archipelago Nature Reserve.

History

Pre-European
Recherche Archipelago exhibits evidence of human occupation dated to 13,000 years ago. The objects are believed to extend up to 13,000 years before present, from a time of lower sea levels when many of the islands were joined to the mainland.

European discovery and naming
The islands became known to Europeans when François Thijssen and Pieter Nuyts, sailing on Gulden Zeepaert, charted the coast in 1627. George Vancouver also passed through the archipelago as part of his expedition in HMS Discovery in 1791.
The area was named Archipelago of the Recherche by Rear-admiral Antoine Bruni d'Entrecasteaux in 1792 during a French expedition in search of the vanished navigator Jean-François de Galaup, comte de Lapérouse. The name was taken from one of the admiral's ships, Recherche ("Research"). The bay containing the current town of Esperance was named for his other ship, Espérance.
Matthew Flinders was the first to explore and chart the islands of the archipelago in 1802 as part of his voyage in the Investigator.

Maritime history
Flinders abandoned two anchors when leaving Middle Island in 1803. These were found and recovered in 1973 by divers. The bower anchor is on display at the South Australian Maritime Museum while the stream anchor can be seen at the National Museum of Australia.

Sealers and whalers from other British colonies on the Australian continent frequented the area since at least the early 1820s. Australia's only recorded pirate, Black Jack Anderson, frequented the archipelago in the 1830s. A former whaler, he turned to piracy and wreaked havoc in the area until being murdered by his crew.
Middle Island was regarded as the right whale hunting station of the bight in the 1830s and 1840s.

The archipelago is recorded as the site of shipwrecks and other maritime incidents. The brig Belinda was wrecked off Middle Island while sealing in late 1824. The crew unsuccessfully attempted to reach Sydney in two boats, and were eventually rescued by the Nereus. The schooner Liberty salvaged the wreck the following year collecting metal stores and both the anchors. The Mountaineer was sunk off Thistle Cove near Cape Le Grand in 1835 while attempting to find shelter from a gale. The Rodondo was thought to be wrecked on Polloch Reef off Salisbury Island in 1895. The SS Penguin was wrecked in 1920 off Middle Island while trying to shelter from a gale. The vessel was salvaged later the following year. On 14 February 1991 the Sanko Harvest a bulk carrier of 33,024 tons sank in the archipelago – and it became the second largest wreck that can be dived on in the world. The response to pollution caused by the wreck was reported upon soon after.

Uses of the area now include recreational and commercial fishing, and shipping from the Port of Esperance. Commercial fishing is primarily for abalone, southern rock lobsters, pilchards, and sharks, and fishing tourism is an established industry. The area is proposed for other applications of aquaculture, including farming trials of bluefin tuna.

Geography

The archipelago includes 105 features classed as islands, and more than 1500 islets.
The islands are generally composed of granite outcrops, often with steep slopes and usually lacking beaches. A large number of features are submerged, some becoming exposed by tides.
The coast is subject to some of the most extreme wave energy in all of Australia, with the wave energy causing abrasion as far down as  during storms.

Groups

The islands are usually considered as being either in the western group, near Esperance and Woody Island and Cape Le Grand National Park, or in the eastern group where Middle Island is most prominent, near Cape Arid National Park. Some surveys of the archipelago go further than the eastern and western distinction and consider groupings around named islands, such as the Woody Group and the Remark Group.

Part of the area is included in the bioregion described as Esperance 2 (ESP2), the 'Recherche subregion', which contains Cape Le Grand National Park at its western end, and the Cape Arid National Park at the eastern end. This area is named the Recherche Archipelago Nature Reserve.

Islands

Tour operator Don MacKenzie was granted permission to land passengers on Woody Island in 1973. The MacKenzie family built the jetty that is still used for visitors to disembark from tourist boats.

Flora and fauna
The area is a biodiversity hotspot with high biodiversity and a large number of species that are native to the region. The environment contains a diverse array of subtropical and temperate flora and fauna.
Larger islands have a substrate that supports vegetation, nesting birds, and other animals. A complex marine environment is found in the surrounding waters, the benthic habitat is various densities of seagrass meadows, reefs, or bare sand.

Marine
The waters around the islands meet often steep faces of granite, the extensive reefs and other features form habitat which supports a rich diversity of marine life. This includes 263 known species of fish, 347 known species of mollusc, and over 450 types of sponge, sea grasses, and soft corals. A coral-like algae species, rhodoliths, form beds which support marine species of spiders, snails, and worms, also acting as a creche for scallops. Marine mammals associated with the islands include two species of seal, large groups of common dolphins (Delphinus delphis), and minke whales (Balaenoptera acutorostrata).

Seagrasses found at the island include: Amphibolis antarctica, Amphibolis griffithii, Halophila decipiens, Halophila ovalis,  Posidonia angustifolia, Posidonia australis, Posidonia coriacea, Posidonia denhartogii, Posidonia kirkmani, Posidonia ostenfeldii, Posidonia sinuosa, Syringodium isoetifolium, and Thalassodendron pachyrhizum.

Terrestrial

The islands support populations of terrestrial flora and fauna, some of which are unique to the archipelago.
New Zealand fur seal (Arctocephalus forsteri) and Australian sea-lion (Neophoca cinerea) breeding colonies are found on some islands, with haul-out sites on many. Marsupials include tammars (Macropus eugenii derbianus), a species of bandicoot (Isoodon obesulus), and two subspecies of rock wallabies (Petrogale lateralis lateralis and Petrogale lateralis hacketti). Snakes include the Recherche Island dugite (Pseudonaja affinis tanneri) on Cull Island, and the python Morelia spilota imbricata. Other reptiles include the barking gecko (Underwoodisaurus milii), ornate dragon (Ctenophorus ornatus), and the southern heath monitor (Varanus rosenbergi). Two species of frog are also found on the islands; the quacking frog Crinia georgiana and spotted-thighed frog Litoria cyclorhyncha.:

Many of the animals and plants are in refugia, where they are remote from factors that threaten mainland populations.

Birds
The archipelago has been identified by BirdLife International as an Important Bird Area (IBA) because it is the only breeding site for the western subspecies of Cape Barren goose known as the Recherche Cape Barren goose. It also supports over 1% of the world populations of flesh-footed shearwaters, sooty oystercatchers, fairy terns and, probably, white-faced storm-petrels. Rock parrots (Neophema petrophila) and red-eared firetails (Stagonopleura oculata) have also been recorded.

Gallery

References

Further reading
 Australian Geographical Society (1952–1954). Expedition to the Recherché Archipelago, Western Australia. Australian Geographical Society reports. no.1 (7 reports in 4 volumes)
pt. 1a. General history by J.M. Bechervaise—pt. 1b. Physiography by R.W. Fairbridge and V.N. Serventy—pt. 2. Birds  by V.N. Serventy—pt. 3. Plants, 3a. Land flora  by J.H. Willis, 3b. Marine algae by H.B.S. Womersley—pt. 4. Mammals  by V. N. Serventy—pt. 5. Reptiles and frogs  by L. Glauert—pt. 6. Spiders and opiliones  by Barbara York Main—pt. 7. Molluscs (sea shells and snails) by J. Hope Macpherson.
 Kendrick, G. (et al.) (2005) Characterising the fish habitats of the Recherche Archipelago Crawley, W.A. University of Western Australia. Fisheries Research and Development Corporation.  "Fisheries Research and Development Corporation report, project no. 2001/060."
 Thomson-Dans, Carolyn, Kendrick, Gary and Bancroft, Kevin (2003) Researching the Recherche.Landscope (Como, W.A), Winter 2003, p. 6–8,

Early cartography
 Beautemps-Beaupré, C. F. (1807) Carte de l'archipel de la Recherche, situé à la partie occidentale de la terre de Nuyts, reconnu par le contre amiral Bruny-Dentrecasteaux, en décembre 1792 (an 1er de l'ere Française)  Paris : Dépôt général des cartes et plans de la marine et des colonies], Battye Library Map Stack B/23/17 Scale [ca. 1:436,000] (Map of Recherche Archipelago showing track of Recherche and Espérance in December 1792). (Battye copy reduced to approximately 1:812,000 and 25 x 38.4 cm)

External links
 Geoscience Australia – location details
  2002 Research project announced
 Map of the region

 
Archipelagoes of Australia
Nature reserves in Western Australia
Important Bird Areas of Western Australia
Great Australian Bight